The women's marathon event at the 2002 Commonwealth Games was held on 28 July.

Results

References
Official results
Results at BBC

Marathon
2002
Commonwealth Games
2002 Summer Olympics
Commonwealth Games marathon